American Sandwich: Great Eats from All 50 States is an illustrated cookbook written by Becky Mercuri. The book provides information on the history of the sandwich and includes sandwich recipes from across the United States including sandwiches such as Colorado's Denver sandwich, Florida's Cuban sandwich, and Louisiana's Muffuletta.

References

2004 non-fiction books
American cookbooks